Nerur may refer to: 
 Nerur (Maharashtra), a place in Maharashtra, India
 Nerur (Tamil Nadu), a place in Tamil Nadu, India